Talbot County may refer to counties:

In the United States
 Talbot County, Georgia
 Talbot County, Maryland

Elsewhere
 Talbot County, Victoria, Australia

County name disambiguation pages